Howard Alan Smith is a senior astrophysicist at the Center for Astrophysics  Harvard & Smithsonian, and is the former chair of the astronomy department at Smithsonian Institution’s National Air and Space Museum in Washington, DC.

A research scientist with several hundred scholarly publications, he served as a visiting astronomer at NASA headquarters. 
He was co-investigator of Kuiper Airborne Observatory (KAO) discovery of a stellar laser at MWC 349.

Active in public education, he has been recognized by Harvard for excellence in teaching. He is a traditional, observant Jew, and has lectured on cosmology and Kabbalah for over twenty years.

He taught a cosmology telecourse for Our Learning Company.

Works

References

External links 
Author's Webpage

Living people
American astronomers
Harvard University faculty
Year of birth missing (living people)
Jewish American scientists
21st-century American Jews